Mackenzie McDonald and Marcelo Melo defeated Rafael Matos and David Vega Hernández in the final, 6–4, 3–6, [10–4] to win the doubles tennis title at the 2022 Japan Open.

Nicolas Mahut and Édouard Roger-Vasselin were the reigning champions from when the event was last held in 2019, but did not participate this year.

Seeds

Draw

Draw

Qualifying

Seeds

Qualifiers
  Sander Gillé /  Joran Vliegen

Qualifying draw

References

 Main Draw
 Qualifying Draw

Doubles